Scaeosopha triocellata is a species of moth of the family Cosmopterigidae. It is found in India.

The larvae feed on Anthocephalus cadamba. They bore the top-shoots of their host plant.

References

Moths described in 1859
Scaeosophinae
Moths of Asia